Saint John the Baptist Church of New Julfa, (Armenian: ,), is an Armenian Apostolic church in New Julfa, Iran. It is located in Charsou neighbourhood of New Julfa, next to St. Catherine Convent.

History 

Saint John the Baptist Church was built in 1621. Originally, the church, like St. Nicholas and St. Minas churches of New Julfa, was called St. Mary. After bringing the left hand relic of St. John the Baptist there by Yeghiazar Amirasatens, the church was renamed to St. John the Baptist. Colloquially, it is called the Hand Church.  There is a chapel built in 1774 in the north side of the courtyard and a belfry was built in 1841. The whole church was renovated in 1859.

See also
Iranian Armenians
List of Armenian churches in Iran

References 

 Architecture in Iran
Churches in Isfahan
Armenian Apostolic churches in Iran
Oriental Orthodox congregations established in the 17th century
Tourist attractions in Isfahan
17th-century churches in Iran
1620s establishments in Iran